Aerodyne may refer to:

Heavier-than-air aircraft, deriving lift from dynamic motion through the air
Fender Aerodyne Telecaster, a contemporary model of the classic Fender Telecaster electric guitar
Fender Aerodyne Jazz Bass, an electric bass guitar which typically has both "jazz" and "precision" style pickups
Dornier Aerodyne, an unmanned VTOL aircraft
Aerodyne Technologies, a former French parachute and paraglider manufacturer